The John M. Parker Agricultural Coliseum or John M. Parker Agricultural Center is a 6,756-seat multi-purpose arena in Baton Rouge, Louisiana. It hosts local sporting events, horse shows, livestock shows and concerts.

History
Constructed by the Works Progress Administration, it was opened in 1937 and sat 12,000 people at its peak. At the time of its construction, it was six feet larger than Madison Square Garden, which made it the biggest coliseum in the United States. It is named after John M. Parker, 27th Governor of Louisiana, who pushed to move the campus to its current location during his tenure.

When it opened in 1937, it became the primary home of the LSU Tigers basketball team, though for several years both the Gym/Armory and the coliseum were used for LSU basketball games. In 1938, the facility hosted the Southeastern Conference men's basketball tournament. In the 1950s, it became the sole home of the LSU Tigers basketball team. In the 1960s, the Coliseum was home to Pete Maravich-led basketball teams and it was his prominence that led to the construction of the LSU Assembly Center which now bears his name.

The basketball team's final season playing in the coliseum was 1970–71. LSU won its final game there, defeating Auburn 114–94 on February 15, 1971.

The former LSU Tigers boxing team held matches at Parker Coliseum and the Huey P. Long Field House. The 1949 LSU boxing team went undefeated in regular season play and finished the year by beating South Carolina in front of 11,000 fans in Parker Coliseum, en route to its first and only national title.

Today, it has reverted to its original purpose as a host of agricultural events, such as rodeos, horse shows, livestock shows, and other events for the LSU AgCenter and the 4-H program. It also serves as the location for Dance Marathon at LSU, which is the only collegiate Dance Marathon program held in an agricultural center.

The rodeo scenes with Matthew McConaughey from his Oscar winning film Dallas Buyers Club were shot at the Coliseum.

See also
Louisiana State University Agricultural Center
LSU Tigers and Lady Tigers

References

External links

 

Basketball venues in Baton Rouge, Louisiana
Boxing venues in Louisiana
Defunct boxing venues in the United States
Defunct college basketball venues in the United States
Equestrian venues in the United States
Indoor arenas in Baton Rouge, Louisiana
LSU Tigers basketball venues
LSU Tigers boxing venues
Sports venues in Louisiana
Louisiana State University buildings and structures
Event venues established in 1937
Sports venues completed in 1937
1937 establishments in Louisiana
Rodeo venues in the United States
Works Progress Administration in Louisiana